The Araguari River (Portuguese, Rio Araguari also called Rio das Velhas) is a river of Minas Gerais state in southeastern Brazil. It is a tributary of the Paranaíba River, which it joins in the reservoir created by Itumbiara Dam.

See also
 Tributaries of the Río de la Plata

References

 Map from Ministry of Transport
 Rand McNally, The New International Atlas, 1993.

Rivers of Minas Gerais